Josef Lada (born 17 December 1887 in Hrusice, Bohemia – 14 December 1957 in Prague, buried at Olšany Cemetery) was a Czech painter, illustrator and writer. He is best known as the illustrator of Jaroslav Hašek's World War I novel The Good Soldier Švejk, having won the Deutscher Jugendliteraturpreis in 1963.

The asteroid 17625 Joseflada has been named after him.

Life
Born in the small village of Hrusice in a cobbler's family, he went to Prague at the age of 14 to become an apprentice binder. Entirely self-taught, he created his own style as a caricaturist for newspapers, and later as an illustrator. He produced landscapes, created frescoes and designed costumes for plays and films. Over the years he created a series of paintings and drawings depicting traditional Czech occupations, and wrote and illustrated the adventures of Mikeš, a little black cat who could talk.

Lada produced nearly 600 cartoons of the Švejk characters, depicting Austria-Hungary officers and civil servants as incompetent, abusive and often drunk. All subsequent editions of Švejk used Lada's illustrations, except for the 2008/2009 Czech edition illustrated by Petr Urban.

Books in English translation

As illustrator

Gallery

References

External links

 Official page (in Czech, from 9/2014 in English)
 Satirist, illustrator and landscape painter Josef Lada subject of major retrospective – Czech Radio

1887 births
1957 deaths
People from Prague-East District
People from the Kingdom of Bohemia
Czech illustrators
Czech comics artists
Czech caricaturists
Czech satirists
Czech children's writers
Czech scenic designers
Writers who illustrated their own writing
20th-century Czech painters
Czech male painters
Burials at Olšany Cemetery
20th-century Czech male artists
Czech anarchists